"These Are The Times" is the second single released from Dru Hill's second album, Enter the Dru. The single reached number 21 on the Hot 100 and number 5 on the R&B chart, staying on the chart for 21 weeks. The song reached the UK Top 5, peaking at number 4, being Dru Hill's highest and last charting hit in that country to date.

Music video
The music video was directed by Bille Woodruff, it was inspired by the film The Man in the Iron Mask. Sisqó played both the good twin and the evil twin and Jazz, Woody and Nokio played the Musketeers. Actress Lark Voorhies appears in the video as Sisqó's love interest.

Track listing

Charts

Weekly charts

Year-end charts

References

1998 singles
1998 songs
Dru Hill songs
Island Records singles
Songs written by Babyface (musician)
Song recordings produced by Babyface (musician)
Songs written by Damon Thomas (record producer)
Contemporary R&B ballads
Soul ballads